Giuseppe de' Medici (1635–1717) was an Italian patrician, belonging to Napolitan branch of House of Medici. He was the first to hold the title of Duke of Sarno.

Early life 
A member of a cadet branch of the Medici family, called the Princes of Ottajano, he was the son of Ottaviano de' Medici, 1st Prince of Ottajano and his wife, Donna Diana Caracciolo.

Marriage and issue 
In 1658 he married Andreana d' Avalos, daughter of Andrea d'Avalos, Prince di Montesarchio (1618-1709) and his wife, Andreana di Sangro. They had one son:
 Ottaviano di Medici (1660-1710); married Teresa de Mari, daughter of Carlo I de Mari, Prince di Acquaviva (1661-1689) and his wife, Gironima Doria. They had issue.

References

Giuseppe
17th-century Italian nobility
1635 births
1717 deaths
17th-century Neapolitan people